Twilight is the debut album by black metal band Twilight. It was released in 2005.

Track listing

Personnel
Malefic - Guitars, vocals, keyboards
Tim Lehi - Guitars, vocals
Neill Jameson - Vocals, bass
Wrest - Drums, guitars, bass, keyboards, effects
Blake Judd - Guitars, vocals, bass

References

2005 debut albums